Acacia suaveolens (sweet wattle) is a  shrub species endemic to Australia.  
It grows to between 0.3 and 3.5 metres high and has smooth purplish-brown or light green bark and has straight or slightly curving blue-green phyllodes  The  pale yellow to near white globular flower heads generally appear between April and September in its native range. These are followed by flattened, bluish  oblong pods which are up to 2 to 5 cm long and 8 to 19 mm wide.

The species was first formally described by English botanist James Edward Smith in 1791 in Transactions of the Linnean Society of London He described it with reference to a cultivated plant at Syon House which had been raised by Thomas Hoy from seed that originated from New South Wales. The species was transferred into the genus Acacia by Carl Ludwig Willdenow in 1806.

The species occurs naturally on sandy soils in heathland and dry sclerophyll forest in South Australia and Victoria, Tasmania, New South Wales and Queensland.

Cultivation
This species provides winter colour in a garden and may be used as a low screen plant.

References

suaveolens
Flora of South Australia
Flora of Victoria (Australia)
Fabales of Australia